Kálmán Csengeri (born 20 September 1959) is a Hungarian weightlifter. He competed in the men's middleweight event at the 1988 Summer Olympics.

References

External links
 

1959 births
Living people
Hungarian male weightlifters
Olympic weightlifters of Hungary
Weightlifters at the 1988 Summer Olympics
People from Ózd
Sportspeople from Borsod-Abaúj-Zemplén County
20th-century Hungarian people